The Hopkins Farm is a home located at 4400 East Quincy Avenue in Cherry Hills Village, Colorado. The home is a -story house that is surrounded by a 1930s agricultural area and additional buildings. The farm was one of many dairy operations in the area.

See also 
National Register of Historic Places listings in Arapahoe County, Colorado

References

External links 

 History of Arapahoe County

Houses in Arapahoe County, Colorado
Historic districts on the National Register of Historic Places in Colorado
National Register of Historic Places in Arapahoe County, Colorado
Farms on the National Register of Historic Places in Colorado